Nijampur-Jaitane, about  north-east of Pimpalner, is  large village in Sakri tehsil in Dhule district of Maharashtra state in India.

Location

Vijaypur-Jaitane lies about 19 km north of Sakri. Maharashtra State Highway 17 (MSH 17) passes close to Nijampur. Nijampur is on Nandurbar-Sakri state highway.
Nijampur-Jaitane is in sakri taluka.

History
It is said to have derived its present name from Nizam-ul-Mulk, who had halted there for some time. In the beginning of the 17th century (1610) it was described as the first great town between Surat and Agra and was inhabited by many wealthy money-lenders.

Fragments of hemadpanthi temples found scattered throughout the village indicate that the place was of some consequence before the advent of the Muslims.

Tourism
The village has a few temples dedicated to various deities but those dedicated to Vitthal Rakhumai, Lord Balaji, Parasnath, Peshve kalin Ganpati Mandir and Gupteshvar are the only ones of any note.

Peshve kalin Ganesh Temple
This temple was established in the 18th century. People strongly believe that if we wish in front of Lord Ganesha, it will become true.

Balaji temple
The idol in the Balaji temple has a richly ornamented brass Prabhaval of excellent design. The temple is to say to have been built in 1769. It is a two stored building. Looked after by the Buwa family for 8 generations.

Parshvanath Jain Temple
Tire antique shrine of Parasnath, the 23rd Jain tirthankar, now devoid of the idol, is a structure of stone and cement of 22.86 meters × 17.98 meters (75 feet × 59 feet) dimensions.

Gupteshvar temple
Gupteshvar shrine it is said that it was uncovered from the ground when a certain resident of Nijampur-Jaitane dreamt of its existence.

 Gopalpura temple
Gopalpura is located near Maruti Temple. The place is very pleasant surrounded by various flower trees. Samadhi of Swami Nityanand is located inside the Gopalpura campus.

The village has also an old gadhi, now in utter ruins, and a spring called Sakharjira whose waters are palatable. The village of nizampur is near to the India biggest project "Suzlon private limited" &"Solar city project".
Outside 3 km on Nijampur-Jaitane has very popular "Mhasai mata temple".
Some people originally belonging to this place have surnames such as Nijampure, Nijampurkar (belonging to Nijampur)
There is a temple of Shree Sant Savta Maharaj which is built in 2010.

Economy

Most of the economy is agriculture related. Vegetables grown in the village are sold in the markets of Surat, Nasik and Mumbai. Crops such as Millet, Chilli, onion, Groundnuts, sugarcane, Gram, cotton, wheat, jowar, etc. are also grown.

Administration

Nijampur has as Village Gram Panchayat for day-to-day administration. The District Zilla Panchayat headquarters is at Dhule and the Block Panchayat is also at Dhule.

Nijampur has no commercial banks, co-operative banks, agricultural credit societies, non-agricultural credit societies or other credit societies present within the village.

See also

 Dhule City
 Dhule District
 List of districts of Maharashtra
 Khandesh

References

 http://www.maharashtra.gov.in/english/gazetteer/DHULIA/places_Nijampur.html
 http://www.whereincity.com/india/pincode/maharashtra/dhule.htm

Villages in Dhule district
Jain temples in Maharashtra